Charles Hartwell (Pinyin: Xià Chálǐ; Foochow Romanized: Hâ Chák-lī; December 19, 1825 - January 30, 1905) was an American Board missionary to Foochow, China in the second half of the 19th century.

Life and work 

Hartwell was born in Lincoln, Massachusetts on December 19, 1825, and was fitted for college at Westford Academy in Westford, Massachusetts. After teaching several months at West Killingly, Hartwell studied theology at Amherst College in 1849, and received the degree of Master of Arts from the same institution three years later. He was ordained at Lincoln, Massachusetts on October 13, 1852, entered the service of the ABCFM, embarked for China on November 3, and reached Hong Kong on April 16, 1853. Hartwell was located at Foochow (today Fuzhou) on June 9, 1853, and was engaged in missionary work there for the rest of his life, with only three visits to the United States: 1865 - 1867, 1877 - 1878, and 1890 - 1891, in all, four years.

Hartwell ranked high as a Sinologist. He spoke the Foochow dialect with fluency, and was one of the proposers of the romanization of that dialect. In addition to preaching the Gospel, he translated one fourth of the New Testament into the Foochow colloquial, composed the Three Character and the Four Character Classics in the same dialect, and various tracts and books (including the 2nd edition of the Dictionary of the Foochow Dialect). He also prepared many textbooks for schools (including one series of the so-called Hongkong Readers), wrote a book on Meteorology, and contributed articles on temperance to English and American journals.

The fiftieth anniversary of Hartwell's arrival at Foochow was celebrated on May 26, 1903, a full account of which was issued from the Foochow Mission Press in February, 1904, in a volume entitled Jubilee Notes.

Hartwell was married twice during his life. On September 6, 1852 he married his first wife Lucy E. Stearns, who died July 10, 1883 in Foochow. In 1885 he married his second wife Hannah Louisa Plimpton Peet Hartwell. Hartwell died of heart failure in Foochow on January 30, 1905. At the time of his death he was the senior missionary of the American Board in China. His wife died 3 years afterwards. His daughter, Emily Susan Hartwell, remained in the field until 1937.

References and further reading

Notes

Protestant missionaries in China
Christian missionaries in Fujian
Protestant writers
1825 births
1905 deaths
American sinologists
American expatriates in China
American Protestant missionaries